Mothing or moth-watching is a form of wildlife observation where moths are observed, both for recreation and for citizen science activities. It is analogous to birdwatching, but for moths.

Many bird observatories also run moth traps.

Techniques 
Mothing is frequently done with the aid of attractants, such as sugary solutions painted in tree trunks or using light. There are also moth traps, which are designed specifically for mothing, with do-it-yourself and commercial versions.

References 

Observation hobbies
Lepidopterology